David Jones, also known as Dai (3 March 1935 – 3 July 2014) was an English professional footballer who played as a goalkeeper.

Career
Jones was born in Orpington and was in the Army before signing for Swansea Town in 1955. He made three appearances for the club in the Football League, as well as two cup appearances. He then played for Yeovil Town, making 363 appearances for them between 1958 and 1967. While with Yeovil he won the Southern League Cup and Southern League Premier Division, and at the time of the death he was ranked twelfth in Yeovil Town's all-time appearance list.

Later life
Jones retired due to injury in 1967, becoming the coach of the Yeovil Town youth team. He later worked as a sales rep and ran his own shop. At the time of his death he had two daughters, six grandchildren and five great grandchildren.

References

1935 births
2014 deaths
English footballers
Swansea City A.F.C. players
Yeovil Town F.C. players
English Football League players
Southern Football League players
Association football goalkeepers